Hilda Madeline Gordon-Lennox, Duchess of Richmond  (née Brassey; 16 June 1872 – 29 December 1971) was the daughter of Henry Brassey and Anna Harriet Stevenson (died 15 July 1898), and granddaughter of the railway pioneer Thomas Brassey. She was known as Lady Settrington from 1893 to 1903, and as Countess of March from 1903 to 1928, when her husband inherited the dukedom.

Lady Settrington joined her husband in South Africa in early 1900, when he served there during the Second Boer War.

She was elected a Fellow of the Royal Horticultural Society in 1902, and in 1927 she became the first chairman of the National Gardens Scheme. She held the office of Justice of the Peace (JP) for Sussex and, later, Morayshire. She was invested as a CBE in the 1919 New Year Honours in recognition of her work with the Soldiers' and Sailors' Families Association, and as DBE in the 1946 New Year Honours in recognition of her work as Vice-President of the Soldiers', Sailors', and Airmen's Families Association.

She died in 1971, aged 99.

Family
On 8 June 1893 Hilda Madeline Brassey married Charles Henry Gordon-Lennox, the 8th Duke of Richmond (born 30 December 1870 – died 7 May 1935); they had the following children:
 	
 Lady Amy Gwendoline Gordon-Lennox (5 May 1894 – 1975); married, in 1917, Sir James Stuart Coats.
 Hon. Charles Henry Gordon-Lennox (15 August 1895 – 5 September 1895)
 Lady Doris Hilda Gordon-Lennox (6 September 1896 – ); married Commander Clare George Vyner. She was a close friend of Queen Elizabeth The Queen Mother.
 Charles Henry Gordon-Lennox, Lord Settrington (26 January 1899 – 24 August 1919)
 Frederick Charles Gordon-Lennox, 9th Duke of Richmond, 9th Duke of Lennox, 4th Duke of Gordon (5 February 1904 – 2 November 1989)

References

 Charles Mosley, editor, Burke's Peerage, Baronetage & Knightage, 107th edition'', 3 volumes (Wilmington, Delaware: Burke's Peerage (Genealogical Books) Ltd, 2003), volume 1, page 489.

1872 births
1971 deaths
Hilda
English duchesses by marriage
Dames Commander of the Order of the British Empire
People from Sussex
Fellows of the Royal Horticultural Society